CL is a South Korean rapper and singer-songwriter. Her discography currently consists of one studio album, one extended play and eighteen singles. Her debut solo single "The Baddest Female" peaked within the top five on the Gaon Digital Chart. She followed up with the track "MTBD" and the standalone singles "Doctor Pepper" and "Hello Bitches". In 2016, her first English-language single "Lifted" became the first entry by a solo female Korean artist to appear on the Billboard Hot 100. In 2019, she released her digital EP project In the Name of Love, and had five of its six tracks peak within the top 15 on the Billboard World Digital Songs chart.

Studio albums

Extended plays

Singles

As lead artist

As featured artist

Other charted songs

Soundtrack appearances

Songwriting credits

Notes

References

Pop music discographies